Ixtlilton ("ink at the face", from ixtli, "face", "eye", tlilli, "black ink", and -ton, diminutive suffix) in Aztec mythology is a god of medicine and healing and therefore was often alluded to as the brother of Macuilxochitl, the god of well-being or good luck. Ixtlilton was a gentle god, who emanated from an obsidian mask which brought darkness and peaceful sleep to children in their beds at night.

References 

Aztec gods
Health gods